Marion McCarthy (10 August 1907 – 21 August 1987) was a Canadian speed skater. He competed in the men's 10,000 metres event at the 1932 Winter Olympics.

References

1907 births
1987 deaths
Canadian male speed skaters
Olympic speed skaters of Canada
Speed skaters at the 1932 Winter Olympics
Speed skaters from Edmonton
20th-century Canadian people